The Floralcroft Historic District, established in 1928 by local real estate developer Flora Mae Gillett-Statler, is a historic neighborhood in Glendale, Arizona. The founder, Flora Mae Gillett-Statler, was born May 29, 1890 to Charles E. and Rachel E. Gillett (née Kuns). Charles Gillett was a Protestant clergyman, personal friend of Governor George W.P. Hunt, and was among the first residents of Glendale. The name Floralcroft was chosen by Flora Mae, who named the subdivision after herself. She platted Floralcroft in 1928, intent on establishing a respectable neighborhood for herself and her two children. She lived in the neighborhood from the completion of her home at 5941 West Northview Avenue until her death on October 4, 1953.

See also

Glendale, Arizona
List of historic properties in Chandler, Arizona
List of historic properties in Glendale, Arizona
List of historic properties in Phoenix, Arizona
List of historic properties in Tempe, Arizona
List of National Historic Landmarks in Arizona
National Register of Historic Places listings in Arizona
National Register of Historic Places listings in Maricopa County, Arizona

References

https://www.glendaleaz.com/planning/documents/NationalRegisterList.pdf
http://www.hmdb.org/Marker.asp?Marker=30496

External links

Houses in Maricopa County, Arizona
Geography of Maricopa County, Arizona
Buildings and structures in Glendale, Arizona
1928 establishments in Arizona
National Register of Historic Places in Maricopa County, Arizona